Shabaqua is a dispersed rural community and unincorporated area in geographic Laurie Township in the Unorganized Part of Thunder Bay District in Northwestern Ontario, Canada. It is on the right bank of the Shebandowan River, as well as on a Canadian National Railway main line, built originally as the Canadian Northern Railway transcontinental main line, between Mabella to the west and Glenwater to the southeast.

References

Other map sources:

Communities in Thunder Bay District